Wadakkanchery State assembly constituency is one of the 140 state legislative assembly constituencies in Kerala. It is also one of the 7 state legislative assembly constituencies included in the Alathur Lok Sabha constituency. As of the 2021 assembly elections, the current MLA is Xavier Chittilappilly of CPI(M).

Local self governed segments
Wadakkanchery Niyamasabha constituency is composed of the following local self-governed segments:

Members of Legislative Assembly 
The following list contains all members of Kerala legislative assembly who have represented the constituency:

Key

     

* indicates by-polls

Election results

Niyamasabha Election 2021 
There were 2,23,003 registered voters in the constituency for the 2021 election.

Niyamasabha Election 2016 
There were 1,97,483 registered voters in the constituency for the 2016 election.

Niyamasabha Election 2011 
There were 1,76,069 registered voters in the constituency for the 2011 election.

References

State assembly constituencies in Thrissur district
Assembly constituencies of Kerala